Underwurlde is a 1984 action-adventure platform video game in the Sabreman series by Ultimate Play the Game for the ZX Spectrum and Commodore 64. The player controls the adventurer Sabreman as he jumps between platforms in a castle and its caverns to find an escape past the exit guardians. Underwurlde features about 600 flip screen areas. Unlike other games of its time, Sabreman is not injured when touched by enemies and is instead knocked backwards. Underwurlde is the second game in the series, between Sabre Wulf and Knight Lore, and released alongside the latter for the ZX Spectrum during Christmas in 1984. Another developer, Firebird, ported the game to the Commodore 64 the next year.

Reviewers recommended the original ZX Spectrum Underwurlde release. They noted its expansive game world and appreciated the parts where Sabreman travelled by bubble. Later critics commented on the game's frustrating difficulty. While the Commodore 64 version was similar to the original, reviews were mixed—one critic thought the title had aged poorly in the year between releases. Your Sinclair placed Underwurlde within its top 20 for the ZX Spectrum, though their readers put it near the bottom of their top 100. The game was later included in Rare's 2015 Xbox One retrospective compilation, Rare Replay.

Gameplay 

Underwurlde is a platform game viewed from a side-angle perspective. The player controls Sabreman, a pith-helmeted adventurer, as he jumps between platforms in a castle and its caverns to find a way to escape past the exit guardians. Sabreman must use a specific weapon—knife, dagger, and torch—that corresponds to each guardian. The player uses the keyboard's QWERTY keys to progress through a series of flip screens in which the player's character reaches the boundary of the viewable area on the screen to flip to another area, with 597 screens in all. While Sabreman begins in a castle adorned with clocks, birds, and baskets, the character must also descend down into caverns through several successive vertical screens. Sabreman automatically attaches a rope to the ceiling when the player controls him off of a ledge. The player can then swing Sabreman side to side to jump to another ledge. At the bottom of a cavern, Sabreman can ride a bubble to the top.

As a change from earlier games by the developer, Sabreman is invulnerable to enemies and is instead knocked back in a bounce by their touch. However, Sabreman will fall to his death if knocked off a precipice. The player starts with seven lives and few extras can be found throughout the game. Blue gemstone power-ups turn Sabreman invincible to falls from any height for a limited amount of time. Enemies include harpies and gargoyles, who can be killed by Sabreman's weapon. After passing the first guardian, eagles appear and can pick up and drop Sabreman. Underwurlde has three possible endings, and each was designed to correspond to the plots of the three planned sequels in the Sabreman series. The player receives a score calculated by the number of objects acquired, enemies defeated, and percentage of rooms visited. The game also supports keyboard and joystick control, and as with other games from the developer, the instructions packaged with Underwurlde were cryptic, and left the player to figure out the controls and sequence on their own. The Commodore 64 version of the game is similar to the original in appearance and gameplay.

Development 

Little is known about the development processes of Ultimate Play the Game, which was known for its avoidance of media spotlight. Its founders, brothers Tim and Chris Stamper, were infamously taciturn both to preserve their time and to let their games speak for themselves. Though as the Sabreman series became popular, their silence contributed to the series' mystique. The main criticism of Underwurlde predecessor and the first game in the Sabreman series, Sabre Wulf, was its similarity to an earlier game by the Stamper brothers, as both were depicted in a top-down view as action-adventure games. While Retro Gamer wrote that the sequel, Underwurlde, resolved this criticism by instead using a side view as a platform game, Ultimate Play the Game also had a reputation for releasing games outside the order in which they were developed. Indeed, the Stamper brothers claimed to have finished their third Sabreman title, the epochal Knight Lore, in advance of both of its predecessors. The Stampers primarily developed for the ZX Spectrum home computer and outsourced the work of converting their games to work on other types of computers to external developers more familiar with the hardware architecture of other platforms. For instance, Firebird released the Commodore 64 releases of Sabre Wulf and Underwurlde. The game was released alongside Knight Lore for the ZX Spectrum near the 1984 holiday season, and the Commodore 64 version was released a year later.

Reception 

Reviewers recommended the original ZX Spectrum Underwurlde release. Critics noted the game world's size and appreciated the parts where Sabreman travelled by bubble. Retro Gamer described the game's near 600 flip screens as "colossal". At the time of its release, Computer and Video Games said it was likely the most expansive world on the platform. Later reviews noted the game's exceptional difficulty. Crash magazine recommended the game as "A Crash Smash".

ZX Spectrum magazine Crash considered Underwurlde to be "excellent" and Ultimate's best game. Each of the magazine's three reviewers appreciated different features of Sabreman's navigation within the game, but mainly liked riding volcanic bubbles and being carried by birds. Another reviewer compared Sabreman's jump to that of Bugaboo (The Flea) and added that the game's single difficulty level was adequately balanced. All three Crash critics noted that the QWERT keyboard controller mapping worked well in this game, though it was awkward in others. They also praised Underwurlde detailed graphics and sound. One reviewer additionally noticed that the game lacked a score leaderboard, but surmised that this was a trade-off for the game's expansive world. Unlike Crash, Computer and Video Games did not like the controls, which was the reviewer's main criticism of the game. Another ZX Spectrum reviewer, Chris Bourne (Sinclair User), said that the game was fast, colourful, and akin to a "vertical Atic Atac".

Commodore 64 magazine Zzap!64 reviewers were mixed. Jaz Rignall said it was among the best arcade adventures on the Commodore 64 since it had the right balance of frustration and addiction to keep him playing the ZX Spectrum version for weeks. Gary Penn, however, considered the game average when it first released for the ZX Spectrum and thought that the port of the year-old game had out-of-date sounds, out-of-tune title music, and was overall not among the Commodore 64's best adventure games. Gary Liddon thought that the Commodore 64 version appeared "crude" compared to other releases for the platform, though perhaps par for the ZX Spectrum. The magazine noted the difficulty of traversing the vertical caverns and found the eagles annoying, especially when they dropped Sabreman to his death. Zzap!64 critics felt that the game presented well, but was less accessible, overpriced for its age, and poorly animated. Ultimately, they considered the game better than the developer's previous two 1985 releases, but not as good as it could have been. The Computer and Video Games review of the Commodore 64 release judged otherwise: that the version was up to the developer's standards and worth the yearlong wait. The magazine praised Firebird's work on the port.

Legacy 

In the early 1990s, Your Sinclair rated the game within the top fifth of their top 100 ZX Spectrum games. The magazine said that Underwurlde was the most simultaneously loved and hated game of its era—though Sabreman's invulnerability to direct damage was novel, the Your Sinclair also recalled the game's "stratospheric level of frustration". Their readers, however, ranked the game near the bottom of their top 100 games for the platform. Underwurlde was later included in the 2015 Xbox One retrospective compilation Rare Replay, wherein critics rated it among the worst of the 30 titles by Ultimate Play the Game and its successor, Rare. Kyle Hilliard (Game Informer) wrote that Ultimate's early games, such as Underwurlde, fared the worst in the package, though he was glad they were included. "By today's standards," began New Zealand newspaper The Nelson Mail, "the likes of ... Underwurlde are so clunky and archaic that they are almost laughably impenetrable; strange relics from a bygone era that serve only to illustrate how far the industry has progressed."

Notes

References

External links
 
 
 

1984 video games
Action-adventure games
Commodore 64 games
Platform games
Rare (company) games
Single-player video games
ZX Spectrum games
Video games developed in the United Kingdom